The Buck Buchanan Award is awarded annually to the most outstanding defensive player in the Division I Football Championship Subdivision (formerly Division I-AA) of college football, and was first given in 1995 after the Walter Payton Award was designated solely for offensive players.

It was named in honor of Pro Football Hall of Fame defensive tackle Buck Buchanan, who starred at Grambling State University. Buchanan was an All-American defensive lineman and the first overall pick in the 1963 American Football League (AFL) Draft by the Kansas City Chiefs.

Up until 2015, the Payton and Buchanan Awards were awarded by The Sports Network. Since STATS LLC, now known as Stats Perform, acquired The Sports Network in February 2015, it has presented all of the major FCS awards. Through the 2011 season, the awards were presented the night before the NCAA Division I Football Championship, but the 2012 awards were presented on December 17, nearly three weeks before that season's championship game.

Winners

Awards won by school 
This is a list of the colleges and universities who have had a player win a Buck Buchanan Award. Cal Poly (2004, 2005, 2006) is the only program with three winners.  Appalachian State (1995–1996), Eastern Washington (2008, 2010), James Madison (2001, 2009), Montana (2007, 2019), Montana State (2012–2013), and Western Illinois (1998, 2000), are the only schools to win the award twice. Dexter Coakley of Appalachian State is the only player to win the award twice.

^ Team is now a member of the Football Bowl Subdivision (FBS).

References

External links
Buck Buchanan Award - Past winners from The Sports Network

College football national player awards
Awards established in 1995